Baumstark is a German surname. Notable people with the surname include:

 Anton Baumstark (1800–1876), German classical philologist
 Carl Anton Baumstark (1872–1948), German orientalist, philologist and liturgist
 Gertrude Baumstark (born 1941), Romanian and German chess player

German-language surnames